Randy Bradbury (born September 20, 1964) is the current bass guitar player for the Californian punk band Pennywise.
He joined in October 1996 when founding bass player Jason Thirsk took a leave of absence to go to rehab for alcohol addiction. Bradbury was supposed to switch to rhythm guitar when Thirsk returned, but it never happened due to Thirsk's suicide in 1996. Bradbury played bass for early punk pioneers The Falling Idols, bass for the last Tender Fury album,  as well as playing bass on the first two albums by One Hit Wonder before leaving to join Pennywise. He has a tattoo of Jack Bruce on his arm.

Discography (partial)
One Hit Wonder
Where's the World (1994)
Clusterphukastuff (1996)

Pennywise
Unknown Road (1993)
Full Circle (1997)
Straight Ahead (1999)
Land of the Free? (2001)
From the Ashes (2003)
The Fuse (2005)
Reason to Believe (2008)
All or Nothing (2012)
Yesterdays (2014)

References

External links

1964 births
Living people
American punk rock bass guitarists
American male bass guitarists
20th-century American bass guitarists
20th-century American male musicians